The 1967 Mexican Grand Prix was a Formula One motor race held at the Ciudad Deportiva Magdalena Mixhuca on 22 October 1967. It was race 11 of 11 in both the 1967 World Championship of Drivers and the 1967 International Cup for Formula One Manufacturers. 

For the first time in 8 years, two teammates went into the last race with a chance of winning the title. Denny Hulme on 47 points required a fourth-place finish to claim the drivers' title. Jack Brabham with 42 points needed to win the race and for Hulme to finish fifth or lower.

The race was won by over a minute by Jim Clark, driving for Lotus-Ford, despite not being able to use his clutch during almost the entire race. New Zealander Denny Hulme clinched his only World Championship by coming home third, earning the necessary points to edge out teammate and three-time World Champion Jack Brabham.

Classification

Qualifying

Race

Championship standings after the race 

Drivers' Championship standings

Constructors' Championship standings

 Notes: Only the top five positions are included for both sets of standings. Only the best 5 results from the first 6 rounds and the best 4 results from the last 5 rounds counted towards the Championship. Numbers without parentheses are Championship points; numbers in parentheses are total points scored.

References 

Mexican Grand Prix
Mexican Grand Prix
1967 in Mexican motorsport
October 1967 sports events in Mexico